Sphyraena viridensis, the yellowmouth barracuda or yellow barracuda is a predatory ray finned fish from the family Sphyraenidae, the barracudas, which is found in the warmer waters of the western Atlantic Ocean and the Mediterranean Sea. It is often confused with the European barracuda Sphyraena sphyraena.

Description
Sphyraena viridensis has a long, fusiform body with a long, streamlined pointed snout which has a long mouth lined with two rows of sharp, fang-like teeth and a jutting lower jaw. There are no scales on the preoperculum, unlike the Mediterranean Barracuda which has scales on both the anterior and posterior margins of the preoperculum. There are numerous transverse dark bars on the dorsum and these are longer, extending below the lateral line, towards the head while in S. sphyraena they do not extend to the lateral line. Generally the colouration is a countershaded dark above, silvery below and the barring fades on dead specimens. Juveniles are described as being dark yellow or greenish in colour. S. viridensis averages smaller than S. sphyraena growing to a standard length of 65 cm, although the average length is 35–40 cm. but specimens up to 114.5 cm have been caught of the Azores. The rod caught record is 10.2 kg which was caught off Lanzarote in the Canary Islands in 2007.

Distribution
The exact distribution of Sphyraena viridensis is unclear because of confusion with S. sphyraena. It occurs in the eastern central Atlantic around the Azores, Madeira, Cape Verde Islands and the Canary Islands and has been recorded in the eastern Mediterranean off Lebanon. It has also been recorded in the Mediterranean in the Adriatic Sea, Aegean Sea, off Israel, Algeria, Corsica and Sicily.

Ecology
In the Azores fish made up all of the diet and the most important species in the diet of Sphyraena viridensis was the bluejack mackerel Trachurus picturatus being found as having been preyed upon by 72.4% of the fish sampled and making up nearly two thirds of the weight of prey taken. Other species taken in this study included single examples of bogue Boops boops, ornate wrasse Thalassoma pavo and axillary sea bream Pagellus acarnae, as well as an unidentified species of the Exocoetidae. Unidentified fish remains were found in nearly 20% of the specimens sampled. In the same study the predatory behaviour of S.viridensis was observed and they are active pursuit predators of fish with one or many barracudas pursuing fish, either singling out lone prey or attacking shoals of prey fish. The pursuit was rapid and was usually over in 8–40 seconds and the more fish were involved the higher the rate of success was. In these observations other fish species than those sampled from specimens were observed as prey e.g. longspine snipefish Macrorhamphosus scolopax and boar fish Capros aper. It is also known to feed on cephalopods and crustaceans.

In summer they form schools of up to 180 fish, although most schools number 30-40 fish, in areas where there are strong currents. These schools are predominantly made up of sub-adult fish with the smaller fish nearer to the surface and the larger, usually female, fish at the bottom of the school at depths of up to 30m. In winter the only aggregations are small groups of juveniles in shallow bays. No territorial behaviour was observed. Schooling is thought to be an anti predator defence and to facilitate mating with the smaller males being attracted to the larger females, in addition groups of barracudas were more successful in hunting prey fish than single fish. This species does not appear to mix with other barracuda species in mixed schools but there are reports of these fish associating with whale sharks in the Azores and an instance of them actively swimming towards a manta ray 
Mobula tarapacana.

In the Azores juveniles of Sphyraena viridensis are preyed upon by the lizard fish Synodus saurus, this predation shows that there is an overlap in habitat between the juvenile barracudas and the lizard fish which occur in sheltered, very enclosed bays with sandy substrates.

Fisheries
Sphyraena viridensis is landed in small quantities in the eastern Mediterranean by fishermen using in trammel-nets and beach-seines. It has been reported from markets in Turkey but it is generally caught as a bycatch, although as numbers increase in the Mediterranean it may be becoming a more important species for fisheries.

References

External links
 

Sphyraenidae
Fish of the Mediterranean Sea
Fish of the Atlantic Ocean
Fish of Europe
Sport fish
Fish described in 1829
Taxa named by Georges Cuvier